is a former Japanese football player.

Playing career
Morinaga was born in Tokyo on February 23, 1982. He joined J1 League club Tokyo Verdy in 2001. In 2002, he moved to FC Shinjuku. In 2003, he moved to China and played for Shenzhen Jianlibao and Qingdao Aokema.

References

External links

1982 births
Living people
Association football people from Tokyo
Japanese footballers
J1 League players
Tokyo Verdy players
Expatriate footballers in China
Association football midfielders